Marieberg may refer to:

 Marieberg, Stockholm
 Marieberg, Örebro